Dr. Gillespie's Criminal Case is a 1943 film in the Dr. Kildare series. Based on characters created by Max Brand. The third of MGM's Dr. Gillespie series (6 in all) to dispense with the services of Dr. Kildare (Lew Ayres) (8 in all) after Dr. Kildare's Victory (1942).

Plot

Dr. Gillespie is kidnapped by mentally unstable convict patient Roy Todwell and his gang.

One nurse dies of erysipelas, while four children successfully recover.

Cast
 Lionel Barrymore as Dr. Leonard B. Gillespie
 Van Johnson as Dr. Randall 'Red' Adams
 Keye Luke as Dr. Lee Wong How
 Alma Kruger as Molly Byrd
 John Craven as Roy Todwell
 Nat Pendleton as Joe Wayman
 Margaret O'Brien as Margaret
 Donna Reed as Marcia Bradburn
 Michael Duane as Sgt. Patrick J. Orisin
 William Lundigan as Alvin F. Peterson
 Walter Kingsford as Dr. Walter Carew
 Marilyn Maxwell as Ruth Edly
 Henry O'Neill as Warden Kenneson
 Marie Blake as Sally
 Frances Rafferty as Irene

Reception
According to MGM records the movie earned $510,000 in the US and Canada and $272,000 elsewhere resulting in a profit of $179,000.

References

External links
 Dr Gillespie's Criminal Case at TCMDB
 
 
 

1943 films
1943 crime drama films
American black-and-white films
American crime drama films
Films about kidnapping
Films directed by Willis Goldbeck
Films scored by Daniele Amfitheatrof
Films set in New York City
Films set in hospitals
Metro-Goldwyn-Mayer films
1940s English-language films
1940s American films